Tarachidia was a genus of moths of the family Noctuidae, it is now considered a synonym of Ponometia.

Former species
 Tarachidia alata Smith, 1905
 Tarachidia albimargo Barnes & McDunnough, 1916
 Tarachidia albisecta Hampson, 1910
 Tarachidia albitermen Barnes & McDunnough, 1916
 Tarachidia bicolorata Barnes & McDunnough, 1912
 Tarachidia binocula Grote, 1875
 Tarachidia bruchi Breyer, 1931
 Tarachidia candefacta Hübner, [1831]
 Tarachidia carmelita Dyar, 1914
 Tarachidia clausula Grote, 1882
 Tarachidia corrientes Hampson, 1910
 Tarachidia cuta Smith, 1905
 Tarachidia dorneri Barnes & McDunnough, 1913
 Tarachidia erastrioides Guenée, 1852
 Tarachidia flavibasis Hampson, 1898
 Tarachidia heonyx Dyar, 1913
 Tarachidia huita Smith, 1903
 Tarachidia libedis Smith, 1900
 Tarachidia margarita Schaus, 1904
 Tarachidia marginata Köhler, 1979
 Tarachidia mixta Möschler, 1890
 Tarachidia morsa Köhler, 1979
 Tarachidia nannodes Hampson, 1910
 Tarachidia nigrans Köhler, 1979
 Tarachidia parvula Walker, 1865
 Tarachidia phecolisca Druce, 1889
 Tarachidia semibrunnea Druce, 1909
 Tarachidia semiflava Guenée, 1852
 Tarachidia septuosa Blanchard & Knudson, 1986
 Tarachidia tortricina Zeller, 1872
 Tarachidia venustula Walker, 1865
 Tarachidia virginalis Grote, 1881
 Tarachidia viridans Smith, 1904

References
Natural History Museum Lepidoptera genus database
 Tarachidia at funet.fi

Acontiinae
Obsolete arthropod taxa